Duleh Khoshk-e Aziz (also Romanized as Dūleh Khoshk-e ʿAzīz; also known as Dūleh Khoshk-e Şāleḩī) is a village in Ozgoleh Rural District, Ozgoleh District, Salas-e Babajani County, Kermanshah Province, Iran. At the 2006 census, its population was 86, in 15 families.

References 

Populated places in Salas-e Babajani County